The 1876 Wanganui by-election was a by-election held  on 27 September 1876 in the  electorate during the 6th New Zealand Parliament. It was then a two-member electorate; the other member being John Bryce.

The by-election was caused by the resignation of the incumbent, Julius Vogel, who was going to London as Agent-General. He was replaced by William Fox, despite him being absent from the colony at the time and not expected back for two months.

John Morgan, who came second was a farmer. He was nominated as William Fox had not been communicated with, and might wish to go in the upper house rather than the lower house when he returned.

Result
The following table gives the election result:

References

Wanganui 1876
1876 elections in New Zealand
September 1876 events
Politics of Manawatū-Whanganui